Les Aristos is a 2006 French comedy film directed by Charlotte de Turckheim.

Plot
The Arbac Family Neuville is a family of penniless aristocrats, that to survive and continue living their castle into disrepair, need to conduct some tricks like selling fake antiques to tourists. One day arises a bailiff commissioned by the Treasury for the recovery of a sum of nearly two million euro in respect of tax. In the event of default, all the family property will be seized. Follows a race against time to find the money. Everything is tried: a visit to the distant cousins still rich, a job search at the employment center in the Pauline boards, letter carrier and family friend, nothing works. Finally, Charles-Antoine, the eldest, who will have to go to a rally to go fishing to young unmarried aristocrat, namely Marie-Astrid Saumur-Chantilly Fortemure, wealthy heiress but particularly repulsive and stupid. Marriage is about to be organized, but Anthony Charles becomes infatuated with Pauline, opposing the interests of the family, the reasons of which reason knows nothing heart ...

Cast

 Charlotte de Turckheim as Countess Solange
 Jacques Weber as Count Charles Valéran
 Catherine Jacob as Duchess Marie-Claude Saumur Chantilly
 Urbain Cancelier as Duke Reginald Saumur Chantilly
 Armelle as Marie-Karoline
 Julia Piaton as Pauline
 Johanna Piaton as Marie-Charlotte
 Gaëlle Lebert as Marie-Astrid
 Vincent Desagnat as Charles-Edouard
 Rudi Rosenberg as Charles-Antoine
 Victoria Abril as Duquessa Pilar de Malaga i Benidorm
 Rossy de Palma as Duquessa Maria de Malaga i Benidorm
 Hélène de Fougerolles as Marie-Stéphanie Montcougnet
 Catherine Hosmalin as Aristo hostess
 Chantal Ladesou as Aristo hostess
 Sébastien Cauet as Lawyer Convert
 Edith Perret as Countess Marthe Ambroisine
 Eric Le Roch as Stanislas Montcougnet
 Benjamin Castera as Charles-Eric
 Antoine de Turckheim as Charles-Victor
 Arthur Derancourt as Charles-Hubert
 Oscar Derancourt as Charles-Gustave
 Sébastien Cotterot as Gonzague
 Swann Arlaud as A good looking man
 Stéphane Bern as TV Host
 Alban Lenoir as Bad guy 2

References

External links
 

2006 films
2000s French-language films
French comedy films
Films directed by Charlotte de Turckheim
2006 comedy films
2000s French films